The Day of the Flemish Community of Belgium is an annual commemoration in the Flemish Community in Belgium on 11 July which marks the anniversary of the Battle of the Golden Spurs (Guldensporenslag) in 1302.

History
In 1302 the French king Philip IV sent an army to punish the Flemish citizens of Bruges, who earlier that year rebelled against the king and attacked the French governor of Flanders (the so-called Good Friday of Bruges).

The French army was composed of about 2,500 knights and squires, supported by about 5,500 infantry. The Flemish, in contrast, fielded a town militia force of 9,000 consisting mostly of infantrymen.

The two forces clashed on 11 July in an open field outside the Flemish city of Kortrijk and the battle ended with the overwhelming victory of the Flemish militia. The commander of the French army, Robert II of Artois, was surrounded and killed on the battlefield. At least a thousand French cavaliers were also killed in the battle and the large number of the golden spurs collected from the field gave the battle its name.

The battle was romanticised in 1838 by Flemish writer Hendrik Conscience in his book De Leeuw van Vlaanderen.

Declaration
Following the establishment of the three cultural and linguistic communities of Belgium in 1970, the Dutch Cultural Community (as it was known then) enacted a law on 6 July 1973, which prescribes the flag, the anthem and the day of the Dutch Cultural Community.

Ever since then the Day of the Flemish community is observed in Flanders. Private employers are not required to award a day's holiday; however the institutions of the Flemish Government and public employers observe this holiday.

See also
Franco-Flemish War (1297–1305)
History of Belgium
Public holidays in Belgium
French-speaking Community Day
German-speaking Community Day

References

External links 
Detailed history of the Battle of Golden Spurs 

Flanders
Flanders
July observances